Sikki grass crafts are various handicrafts that are made from a special kind of grass known as sikki found in Bihar and Uttar Pradesh, India. The art of making items from sikki grass is an ancient one in the province of Bihar.

Tharu women in the southern plains of Nepal, have been weaving traditional baskets from sikki grass for centuries. Nowadays, many Tharu women are engaged in producing sikki handicrafts through collaborative networks.

Procedure
Sikki is dried and the flower head is cut off. The resulting fine golden fibre is used in weaving to make toys, dolls, and baskets (dolchi). Items are sometimes painted.

Boxes made of sikki known as pauti are given to daughters by parents on the occasion of their wedding. The boxes are used to hold sindoor, ornaments, and jewellery.

References

Culture of Bihar
Indian handicrafts
Geographical indications in Bihar